The following is the discography of Uncle Earl, an American folk band. The group has released two EPs and two albums, including 2004's Going to the Western Slope EP and Raise a Ruckus EP, 2005's  She Waits for Night album on Rounder Records, and 2007's Waterloo, TN album also on Rounder Records.

Discography

Albums

EPs

Further reading

See also
Old-time music

References

External links
Uncle Earl's official site

Discographies of American artists
Rhythm and blues discographies